In Ohio, State Route 263 may refer to:
Ohio State Route 263 (pre-1927), now part of SR 170
Ohio State Route 263 (1927), now parts of SR 120 and Holland Sylvania Road